Salus may refer to:

Salus, Roman goddess of health and prosperity
Salus, Iran, a village in West Azerbaijan Province, Iran
Salus University, in Elkins Park, Pennsylvania, the United States
Peter H. Salus, linguist, computer scientist
Robert Salus (born 1877), Austrian ophthalmologist
Hugo Salus (born 1866) German-language writer, poet, and doctor, Prague, Czechoslovakia
Agua Mineral Salus, a brand of bottled mineral water of the Salus company, Uruguay
Samuel W. Salus (1872-1945), American lawyer and politician